RCS may refer to:

Organisations
Racing Club de Strasbourg Alsace
Radio Corporation of Singapore
Radcliffe Choral Society
Rawmarsh Community School
Red Crescent Society
Red Cross Society
Representation of Czechs and Slovaks, a football team
Riverdale Country School, Bronx, New York
RCS MediaGroup (Rizzoli-Corriere della Sera), an Italian publishing group
Romania Cable Systems
Rosehill Christian School
Royal College of Science
RCS Motor Club, and automotive club of the Royal College of Science
Royal College of Surgeons
Royal Conservatoire of Scotland
the Ryan Cayabyab Singers; a Philippine band
Richmond Christian School

People
Ryan Cochran-Siegle, an American World Cup alpine ski racer

Places
First Czechoslovak Republic (RČS: Republic of Czechoslovakia), Czechoslovakia's official name between 1918 and 1920
Rochester Airport, England, UK (IATA airport code RCS)
Risalpur Cantonment railway station, Risalpur, Pakistan (station code RCS)

Transportation
Raleigh, Charlotte and Southern Railway (RC&S), a predecessor to Norfolk Southern Railway (1942–1982)
Reaction control system, a system of thrusters used to maneuver spacecraft
 Reentry control system
 Regional Connectivity Scheme, for aviation in India, under UDAN
 Republic of China Ship (RCS and ROCS), ship prefix for the Republic of China Navy

Technology
Radar cross-section
Radio Computing Services
Real-time control system (disambiguation)
Real-time Control System
remote control system
Resource construction set
Revision Control System
Rich Communication Services, a replacement for SMS used in mobile phone messaging

Other uses
 Regional Command — South (RC-S), a subdivision of International Security Assistance Force in Afghanistan

See also

DVB-RCS, return channel via satellite
RCS & RDS, Romanian telecom company

RC (disambiguation)